The Dr. Edward Francis Gleason House is a historic house in Barnstable, Massachusetts, United States.

Description and history 
The two story wood-frame house was built c. 1790, and is a fine local example of Federal styling. It has an L shape, with intersecting hip roofs, and two interior chimneys. The main entry is centered on the five-bay front facade, and is elaborately framed with sidelight windows and a fanlight, and is sheltered by a portico with Tuscan columns. The house is notable for its association with Dr. Edward Francis Gleason, founder of Cape Cod Hospital, and for its ownership by Timothy Baker, a ship's captain engaged in the coasting trade.

The house was listed on the National Register of Historic Places on September 18, 1987.

See also
National Register of Historic Places listings in Barnstable County, Massachusetts

References

External links
 MACRIS Listing - Edward Francis Gleason House

Houses in Barnstable, Massachusetts
National Register of Historic Places in Barnstable, Massachusetts
Houses on the National Register of Historic Places in Barnstable County, Massachusetts
Federal architecture in Massachusetts